Bentinckia nicobarica is a species of flowering plant in the family Arecaceae found to occur in the Nicobar group of islands in the Bay of Bengal. It is an endemic palm occurring in Great Nicobar, Katchal, Nancowry and  Car Nicobar Islands.

The occurrence of this species in Andaman and Nicobar group of islands other than Katchal Island is yet to be confirmed as natural/escape or by human introduction. It is an endangered species according to IUCN Red List of Threatened Species, 2016 with Red List Category & Criteria as C2a (ver 2.3). Living specimens of this taxon are conserved at the Indian Botanic Garden, Howrah and at the Field Gene Bank of Jawaharlal Nehru Tropical Botanic Garden and Research Institute, Thiruvananthapuram in India.

Description
Bentinckia nicobarica grows about 20m tall and girth is about 25  cm. The stems are used by the local people in house and fence construction. It is generally seen along with other palm species such as Areca catechu, Pinanga manii and Rhopaloblaste augusta.

References

External links
Arkive.

nicobarica
Flora of the Nicobar Islands
Endangered plants
Taxonomy articles created by Polbot
Plants described in 1875